A virtual ward is a means providing support in the community to people with the most complex medical and social needs. The concept was developed in Croydon Primary Care Trust (South London) – and virtual wards have been introduced in Croydon, Dorset, Dudley, Brent, Hillingdon, Bracknell and Nottinghamshire. Virtual wards use the systems and staffing of a hospital ward, but without the physical building: they provide preventative care for people in their own homes. The project won in four categories of the 2006 Health Service Journal Awards (the "UK's Biggest Awards in Healthcare") namely Primary Care Innovation, Patient-Centred Care, Information-Based Decision Making, and Clinical Service Redesign. This was the first time in the 25-year history of the HSJ awards that a project won in four categories. In 2007 it won the Transformation category of the Public Service Awards run by The Guardian and was judged overall winner of those awards.

Key aims
The key aims of virtual wards are to:
 Act on evidence-based forecasts from predictive risk modelling in order to reduce non-elective secondary care (acute hospital) usage
 Provide multidisciplinary case management
 Serve as a communications hub for all those involved in the care for these complex patients
 Offer intuitive working systems that appeal to patients and clinicians alike

Using risk stratification, patients can be identified by their likelihood to require admission into a hospital within the next year. The group of patients examined in this way can be based on a practice, a group of practices, or by a number of long-term conditions. The most commonly used risk stratification tool is the PARR++ Algorithm, which is available to NHS institutions free of charge – the tool takes data available from hospital admissions for the last four years and generates a percentage risk score. A more thorough tool is in development called the BUPA Health Dialogue risk stratification tool, which also accesses hospital data, but adds in data from the patients' practice to generate a risk score – the higher the score, the greater the risk of admission. This tool is available to NHS organisations for a moderate annual subscription. Other tools include the Milliman Advanced Risk Adjuster Tool  provided by GPC Solutions Ltd in the UK that also indicates risk drivers and likely impact on areas of service.

Like a hospital ward, the capacity of the ward is set – usually between 0.5% and 1% of the number of patients grouped together. Also, like a hospital ward, patients are admitted and discharged from those beds. The ward is termed virtual as these beds are not real, and care takes place in the most appropriate setting for the patient, usually at home. Initially, the patients at highest risk of admission to hospital are considered for admission to the ward and for intensive case management. When one of these "beds" becomes vacant as the patient stabilises then the predictive algorithm is looked to for a replacement.

The virtual ward team use enhanced tracking to ensure that they can reduce the likelihood of admission, and should the patient be admitted into secondary care follow their process through hospital and attempt to facilitate an earlier discharge back into the community.

Admission
Admission to a virtual ward is determined both by predictive modelling and by clinical decision making by the virtual ward team and the patient's doctor. This ensures that the patients admitted to a virtual ward are truly those who will benefit the most, i.e. those most at risk of unplanned hospital admission. The NHS in England owns two predictive risk models which were commissioned from a consortium led by The King's Fund. These predictive tools are known as PARR (Patients At Risk of Readmission), which was built by New York University and the Combined Model, built by Health Dialog.

At the time of admission to the virtual ward, the virtual ward lead, which may be an assertive case manager as in Dudley PCT's collaborative model, or a community matron  visits the patient at home and conducts an initial assessment. This record, and all further entries by ward staff, are entered into a community care record, and additionally recorded at the patient's GP practice. A summary from the GP computer system is pasted into these ward notes before the initial assessment, so as to provide background information and avoid unnecessary duplication of work. The GP practice is informed of all significant changes to the patient's management.

Staff
 The day-to-day clinical work of the ward is led by a senior nurse which may be an assertive case manager or a community matron. Other staff include a social worker, health visitor, pharmacist, community nurses and other allied health professionals.
 A key member of staff is the ward administrator ("ward clerk"). With a dedicated telephone number and email address, the ward administrator is able to collect and disseminate information between patients, their carers, GP practice staff, virtual ward staff, out of hours providers, emergency services, and hospital staff.
 Medical input as obtained as needed by the virtual ward team. In most cases the virtual ward team will meet weekly with the GP practice to discuss patients on their case load. The team is also able to book surgery appointments to see any patient's usual GP.
 The virtual ward develops close working relationships with organisations such as hospices, drug & alcohol service and voluntary sector agencies.

Daily routine
Members of the virtual ward staff hold an office-based ward round each working day. Patients are discussed at different frequencies depending on their circumstances and stability. Depending on the size of each ward, there will be a number of beds identified as red, amber and green, from highest to lowest dependency. The virtual ward team with the GP can move patients between these different intensity beds according to changes in their clinical condition from day to day.

Patients in a "red" bed should be reviewed by the team daily, "amber" beds reviewed at least weekly, and "green" beds reviewed no less than monthly. Any patients that the clinical team decide are no longer in need of regular review should be considered for discharge from the ward.

The virtual ward clerk needs to track these patients in the appropriate level bed, track admissions and discharges, and ensure that up-to-date information is available to be supplied to engaged stakeholders.

Discharge
The predictive model used for identifying patients for admission to a virtual ward is also used to prompt the virtual ward staff when it is time to consider discharging the patient. When a patient has been assessed by all relevant virtual ward staff, and has been cared for uneventfully for several months in the "monthly review" section of the ward, then the ward staff may feel that the patient is ready to be discharged to an alternative service, which might include self-directed care, care of the GP or care of another community service. A discharge summary is recorded at the practice, and a discharge letter (written using lay terminology) is sent to the patient. After discharge the patient is still able to contact the virtual ward for advice, and may be readmitted if their clinical need dictates it. This not only ensures that the patient is borne in mind, but these quarterly review data serve as positive feedback to the predictive risk modelling algorithm.

Future plans
Pilots were conducted most notably at Croydon, Dudley, Warwickshire and Wandsworth. There are some variations in the way the virtual ward operates – for example, Warwickshire use a nurse-led model, whereas Wandsworth employ salaried GPs to manage their patients. Dudley uses what has been termed a 'collaborative' model, whereby GPs and community nurses work much more closely together, sharing the clinical workload. This collaborative approach generated both a reduction in secondary care usage, and a reduction in the GPs workload.

As reductions in healthcare funding affect budgets, there has been interest in virtual wards and risk stratification, with attention to the Dudley PCT virtual ward model, developed by Brian Bostock, Carl Beet and Derek Hunter. Unlike previous virtual ward models, the Dudley model incorporates a cross-service borough wide strategy that based on initial data appears effective in achieving positive health outcomes whilst providing cost effectiveness to health budgets.

NHS (England) announced in April 2022 a national ambition to have at least 40 virtual beds per 100,000 population by December 2023.  This would include partnerships with independent sector healthcare providers.

Second generation
Once a virtual ward has been established in an area, they are usually focussed on patients with long term conditions that require complex medical management.

However, use of risk stratification often generates significant numbers of patients that require more specialised management. Whilst an assertive case manager may be able to impact on some of the health needs of these more specialised cases it has been recognised that focussing the appropriately skilled and trained staff in these areas, using a virtual ward model, can be effective. Typically, these specialised areas include mental health, alcohol/drug misuse and children.

Although there has been some development on risk stratification tools for some of these patients (most notably the SPARRA-MD [Scottish Patients At Risk of Re-Admission – Mental Disease] tool), specialised stratification is not essential. Development of virtual ward teams with the specialised skills to deal with these specialised cases is one area of second generation virtual wards.

Not surprisingly, frequent service users are also highlighted by risk stratification, and again, are often difficult to manage by virtual wards alone. Another area that virtual wards are developing is in this specialised patient group.

COVID-19 and virtual wards
The 2020 COVID-19 pandemic was an incentive for trusts to use virtual wards.  Some patients with COVID-19 were arriving at hospital too late as they were not aware  that they had  very low blood oxygen levels. There were both pre-hospital models, in which patients were referred via community routes and post-hospital in which they were discharged quickly to their homes, where they could be monitored remotely by their clinical teams using remote patient monitoring and in particular using pulse oximeters. Programmes of accelerated discharge freed up hospital beds for an expected surge of seriously ill patients.  Royal Wolverhampton NHS Trust launched a COVID patient remote ward in 2021 using software from Dutch digital health specialist, Luscii.  Patients enter oximeter daily readings into an app which analyses the readings, monitoring for any sign of measurement abnormalities which could mean medical attention is required.

This led to expansion into other clinical areas.  University Hospitals Coventry and Warwickshire NHS Trust established a virtual ward in 2022 for 100 heart patients undergoing ablation therapy to treat atrial fibrillation.  This allows remote monitoring of electrocardiogram, selected vital signs, and symptomatic data before and after surgery.   In June 2022 the Northern Care Alliance NHS Foundation Trust announced plans to set up a 500-bed virtual ward using Dignio technology for patients with a variety of different conditions.  Patients will use the MyDignio App to record their vital signs.

References

External links
 Croydon PCT (Virtual Wards webpages)
 NHS Networks (Virtual Wards Microsite)
 King's Fund  (King's Fund Predictive Modelling Project)
 NHS Dudley (Website for NHS Dudley'')

Community nursing